Two Family House is a 2000 American film produced by Alan Klingenstein, based on the story of the uncle of the film's writer and director Raymond De Felitta (Café Society). The film won the Audience Award at Sundance 2000. Many of the film's actors later reached national prominence as part of the HBO cable television series The Sopranos, including Michael Rispoli, Kathrine Narducci, Matt Servitto, Vincent Pastore, Joseph R. Gannascoli, Sharon Angela and Michele Santopietro (Jackie Aprile, Sr., Charmaine Bucco, Agent Harris, Big Pussy, Vito Spatafore, Rosalie Aprile and JoJo Palmice, respectively, in The Sopranos). The songs on the film's soundtrack were done by John Pizzarelli and his trio, a jazz recording artist.

Plot

An unseen narrator (who we gradually come to learn is telling the story of his mother and step-father's romance) looks back to the year 1956, in the Elm Park neighborhood of Staten Island, New York, to one Buddy Visalo (Michael Rispoli), an Italian guy with "Ralph Kramdenesque" dreams. Buddy is a wannabe crooner (with a voiceover provided by Andrew Poretz). Buddy had nearly been discovered by Arthur Godfrey ten years earlier (shown in flashback) when he performed at a USO show while in the service. His fiancée, Estelle (Kathrine Narducci), gave him a Hobson's choice: “Who's it gonna be, Buddy, Arthur Godfrey or me?” In a decision he’ll live to regret the rest of his life, he chooses Estelle, and over the next 10 years tries all sorts of schemes to get ahead. “I just wanna be somebody!” he’ll declare.

Italian-American Buddy decides to buy a dilapidated two-family house in the Irish section of town, intending to live upstairs with his wife Estelle and run a bar downstairs, where he could live out a smaller version of his dream, singing along to a "Music Minus One" jukebox (a precursor to karaoke). Estelle has no confidence in Buddy, just wants a “normal” blue-collar husband who, most of all, won't "embarrass" her by doing anything to make himself stand out, and manages to undermine his plans time and time again. He discovers, to his dismay and her horror, that the upstairs Irish tenants, a drunken, violent older man (played by Kevin Conway) and his very pregnant young wife (played by Kelly Macdonald of Trainspotting fame) refuse to move and won't pay rent.

When the baby is born, it's clear his father is black – and the much older, drunken Irish husband immediately skulks off, knowing it's not his child. Buddy evicts mother and child, then feels guilt and sets her up in an apartment while she sorts out an adoption. Estelle's lack of faith, the small-minded prejudices and low ambitions of his “friends,” the Irish lass's spirit, Buddy's dream, racial prejudice, and the baby's fate play out in an engaging story with real chemistry between the leads and a message that ultimately exemplifies a Joseph Campbell-like "Follow your bliss."

References

External links 

 
 
 
 

2000 films
2000 romantic drama films
Lionsgate films
American romantic drama films
Films directed by Raymond De Felitta
2000 directorial debut films
2000s English-language films
2000s American films